Kızılcık can refer to:

 Kızılcık, Ardanuç
 Kızılcık, Düzce